Fernando de Toledo, (ca. 1528–1591) was a Spanish nobleman.

He was the illegitimate and first son of Don Fernando Álvarez de Toledo, 3rd Duke of Alba, "The Iron Duke", who fathered Fernando de Toledo upon the daughter of a miller of La Aldehuela, in the province of Ávila, Spain.

Not until 1546, when Fernando was nineteen years old, did the duke recognize Fernando as his son.  This later became the subject of a comedy written by the great Spanish playwright Félix Lope de Vega y Carpio; the title of the play, "Más mal hay en La Aldegüela de lo que sueña" means approximately, "There are worse things in Aldehuela than you have dreamt of".

Fernando Toledo was a prior of the Sovereign Military Order of Malta in Castile and León.  He was Captain General of the cavalry of Flanders and Portugal, member of the Council of State, and (from 1571 to 1580) Viceroy of Catalonia, succeeding Diego Hurtado de Mendoza y de la Cerda (also known as Diego de Mendoza y de la Cerda, 2nd Count of Mélito, 1st Duke of Francavilla), who had been viceroy from 1564 to 1571.

Sources

1528 births
1591 deaths
Viceroys of Catalonia
Spanish untitled nobility
Fernando
Fernando
Knights Hospitaller
16th-century Spanish people